Utricularia fistulosa is an affixed aquatic carnivorous plant that belongs to the genus Utricularia (family Lentibulariaceae). It is a widespread species in the northeastern region of Western Australia.

See also 
 List of Utricularia species

References 

Carnivorous plants of Australia
Eudicots of Western Australia
fistulosa
Lamiales of Australia